Up the Creek is a 1958 British comedy film written and directed by Val Guest and starring David Tomlinson, Peter Sellers, Wilfrid Hyde-White, David Lodge and Lionel Jeffries.

Plot
Lieutenant Humphrey Fairweather, a well-meaning but accident-prone naval officer with a passion for rockets, is posted where he can (so the navy hopes) cause no further damage. He is given command of a mothballed Royal Navy vessel, HMS Berkeley, which has had no commanding officer for several years. She is moored at a wharf on the Suffolk coast near the (fictional) village of Meadows End.

He discovers that the ship is woefully under strength and is forced to contend with the schemes of his bosun, Chief Petty Officer Doherty (Sellers). He and the crew are running several profitable businesses, including a same-day laundry, selling naval rum and cigarettes to the local pub, the Pig and Whistle, and making pies and pastries for sale to the villagers. They also keep pigs and hens.

After the naive Fairweather is innocently drawn into the enterprises, he is politely blackmailed into covering for them. But when an admiral makes a surprise inspection, the story eventually comes out. Whilst angrily haranguing them, Admiral Foley accidentally launches Fairweather's experimental rocket, and the ship is sunk.

Because of Fairweather's impeccable connections at the Admiralty, and because the Berkeley was Admiral Foley's first command, Fairwather is not court-martialed. Instead, he is promoted to lieutenant-commander and posted to Woomera to continue his rocketry research, accompanied by Susanne, the attractive French girl he met at the pub. The ship's crew are posted to another ship, HMS Incorruptible.

Cast
 David Tomlinson as Lieutenant Fairweather
 Peter Sellers as Chief Petty Officer Doherty
 Wilfrid Hyde-White as Admiral Foley
 Vera Day as Lily
 Liliane Sottane as Susanne
 Tom Gill as Flag Lieutenant
 Michael Goodliffe as Nelson
 Reginald Beckwith as Publican of 'Pig and Whistle'
 Lionel Murton as Perkins
 John Warren as Cooky
 Lionel Jeffries as Steady Barker
 Howard Williams as Bunts
 Peter Collingwood as Chippie
 Barry Lowe as Webster
 Edwin Richfield as Bennett
 David Lodge as Scouse
 Leonard Fenton as Policeman
 Sam Kydd as Bates
 Basil Dignam as Coombes
 Patrick Cargill as Commander
 Michael Ripper as	Decorator
 Frank Pettingell as Stationmaster

Production
Much of the film was shot at Thomas Ward Ship Breakers, Grays, Essex. The Ship, although referred to by a character in the film as a sloop, was ex Castle-class corvette, .

According to an interview with Val Guest (included on the DVD issue of the film), Up the Creek was the first starring film role for Sellers, at the time known only for radio, short television sketches and film supporting roles. Guest was only able to obtain his services by also including established comedy film star David Tomlinson.

A sequel Further Up the Creek was released later in the same year, with Frankie Howerd replacing Peter Sellers.

Critical reception
The New York Times called the film, "an amiable jest that is diverting and spasmodically amusing, if not precisely unuproarious."
TV Guide said, "it is a surprise that UP THE CREEK is as fresh and amusing as it is... Sellers, in one of his earliest roles, steals the show."

Box Office
Kinematograph Weekly listed it as being "in the money" at the British box office in 1958.

References

External links

1958 films
British comedy films
1950s English-language films
Films about the Royal Navy
Films directed by Val Guest
Films set on ships
Military humor in film
1958 comedy films
Films shot at New Elstree Studios
Films shot in Essex
1950s British films